Hanezu (translit. Hanezu no tsuki) is 2011 Japanese drama film directed by Naomi Kawase, based on a novel by Masako Bando. The title is an ancient Japanese word for a shade of red, taken from the 8th century poetry collection Man'yōshū. The story is set in contemporary time in the Asuka area and recalls the ancient history of the place. The film premiered In Competition at the 2011 Cannes Film Festival.

Cast
 Tohta Komizu as Takumi
 Hako Oshima as Kayoko
 Tetsuya Akikawa as Tetsuya
 Akaji Maro as Yo-chan
 Taiga Komizu as Hisao, Takumi's grandfather
 Kirin Kiki as Takumi's mother
 Norio Nishikawa as Takumi's father
 Miyako Yamaguchi as  Kayoko's mother

Production
The film was produced through Kumie in co-production with the Kashihara-Takaichi Regional
Administrative Association. It was shot on 16 mm film on location in the Nara Prefecture, which is where director Naomi Kawase comes from and lives. The actors had no rehearsals, instead Kawase made them live in the region for a month prior to filming in order to create their characters, which were further developed through discussions with the director. Once filming, Kawase tried to restrict each scene to one take only.

References

External links
 

2011 films
2011 drama films
Japanese drama films
2010s Japanese-language films
Films directed by Naomi Kawase
2010s Japanese films